Adam Nicholas Barrett (born 29 November 1979) is an English former professional footballer who played as a central defender. During his career, which lasted from 1998 to 2017, he made 647 appearances in the Football League, including 308 for Southend United. He is currently a first team coach at Millwall.

Born in Dagenham, Barrett began his career with Leyton Orient, but failed to make an appearance for them and moved on to sign for Plymouth Argyle, spending the 1999–2000 season with them. In 2000, he moved to Mansfield Town and then spent two years at Bristol Rovers before joining Southend United in 2004. He helped Southend from League Two to the Championship during a six-year stay at Roots Hall, and played over 250 times for the Club before signing for Crystal Palace in 2010. He would go on to play for Leyton Orient (loan), AFC Bournemouth, Gillingham and AFC Wimbledon. In January 2015, he re-joined Southend United.

Club career

Southend United
Barrett joined Southend United, on a free transfer at the beginning of the 2004–05 season. Successive promotions from League Two and League One in 2004–05 and 2005–06 saw Southend competing in the Championship for the 2006–07 season. Barrett quickly established himself as a fan's favourite. He scored 11 goals in his first season with the Blues, a high figure for a centre-back, and was voted Player of the Year by Southend fans.

Barrett was influential in Southend's sixth-place finish, though their season ended with a playoff semi-final defeat to Doncaster Rovers. He played the full 90 minutes in a memorable 1–1 draw with Chelsea at Stamford Bridge in the FA Cup third round on 3 January 2009. And he scored a goal in the replay, although Southend United would go on to lose the match 4–1.

On 24 June 2010, Barrett had his contract terminated by mutual consent.

Crystal Palace
Barrett signed a two-year contract for Crystal Palace on 6 July 2010. Barrett made his Palace debut on 10 August 2010, in a 0–1 win against Yeovil Town. He made his league debut in just over a week later against Ipswich Town. He played his last game for the club in a 1–1 draw against Watford in February 2011.

Leyton Orient
On 11 March 2011, Barrett returned on a month's loan to his first club Leyton Orient.

AFC Bournemouth
Barrett signed a two-year deal with AFC Bournemouth on 5 July 2011. Barrett scored against his former club Crystal Palace in a pre-season friendly against them on 30 July. The newly appointed captain then netted his first competitive Cherries goal in his first home league match; a 2–0 win over Sheffield Wednesday on 13 August 2011.

Gillingham
On 16 August 2012, Barrett signed a one-year deal with Gillingham with the option for the contract to be extended to two years.
He was quickly made captain at Priestfield and led the Gills to win the League Two championship. His regular combative performances quickly won the fans over and he was awarded the club's Supporters' Player of the year and Away Supporters' Player of the year awards. Barrett was also named in the League Two team of the year.

Return to Southend United
On 15 January 2015, Barrett re-joined Southend United. An injury delayed Barrett's homecoming but he finally made his second debut for Southend as a second-half substitute against Cheltenham Town on 10 February 2015. At the end of the 2014–15 season he played for Southend in the League Two play-off final against Wycombe Wanderers. Southend won in a penalty shoot-out and were promoted to League One. The following month Barrett signed a new one-year contract at Southend, reversing his decision to retire which he had announced in February 2015. In March 2016 Barrett signed a further one-year deal keeping him at Southend until 2017. Towards the end of the 2015–16 season Barrett replaced John White as the captain, a role Barrett previously held in his first spell at the club before leaving in 2010.

On 24 September 2016 Barrett played his 350th game for Southend in all competitions, over two spells with his boyhood club 

On 28 February 2017 Barrett announced his retirement from playing.

Coaching career

Millwall
On 10 March 2017, Barrett joined Millwall as first team development coach. Following the resignation of Neil Harris on 3 October 2019, Barrett took over as caretaker manager. In his first game in charge he led Millwall to a 2–1 win over Leeds United.

Career statistics
Information correct as of 11 May 2022.

Managerial statistics

Honours
Southend United
Football League Two play-offs: 2005, 2015
Football League One: 2005–06

Gillingham
Football League Two: 2012–13

Individual
PFA Team of the Year: 2004–05 League Two, 2005–06 League One, 2012–13 League Two
Gillingham Player of the Season: 2012–13

References

External links

Adam Barrett profile SouthendUtd.com

1979 births
Living people
English footballers
Leyton Orient F.C. players
Plymouth Argyle F.C. players
Mansfield Town F.C. players
Bristol Rovers F.C. players
Southend United F.C. players
Crystal Palace F.C. players
AFC Bournemouth players
Gillingham F.C. players
English Football League players
Footballers from Dagenham
Association football defenders
Millwall F.C. non-playing staff
Millwall F.C. managers
English football managers
English Football League managers
Association football coaches